Feda is a village in  Kvinesdal, Vest-Agder, Norway.

Feda or FEDA may also refer to:
Feda (municipality), a former municipality in Vest-Agder county, Norway
Feđa, Bosnian given name includes list of people named Feđa
Further Education Development Agency, UK government body now the Learning and Skills Development Agency
Foodservice Equipment Distributors Association, American trade organisation
Feda: The Emblem of Justice, a 1994 Japanese video game
Feda, the spirit through whom the medium Gladys Osborne Leonard gave readings
Federación Española de Ajedrez, governing body of chess in Spain, organiser of Spanish Chess Championship
Bus Feda, Irish bus company
Forces Elèctriques d'Andorra, an electricity company in Andorra
FeDA: Fe deficiency anemia, a disease, where Fe is the element symbol for iron

See also